The Basarab Overpass is a road overpass in Bucharest, Romania, connecting Nicolae Titulescu blvd. and Grozǎveşti Road, part of Bucharest's inner city ring. A design by engineer Javier Manterola, its construction was undertaken by FCC and Astaldi.

History 

On 17 June 2011, the overpass was officially inaugurated, and was opened to traffic on 19 June. The project was completed in August 2011, when ramps and elevators for the tram stations were installed.

The bridge now accommodates the number 1 tram line, the only circular tram line in Bucharest that follows the inner traffic circle of the city.

The Basarab Overpass in numbers

The overpass was opened in June 2011 at a cost of almost 255 million euros.

Every day, almost 50,000 vehicles cross the bridge.

See also
 Tourism in Romania
 Seven Wonders of Romania
 List of bridges in Romania

References

External links

General Description at the contractor's site

Transport in Bucharest
Bridges completed in 2011
Bridges in Romania